Radonić is a Serbo-Croatian surname.

It is characteristic that in Vojvodina has the surname Radonić therefore 'nj' was transformed into 'n', This was done on surnames of natives who came from the Great Migration in 1690 with the Patriarch Arsenije Čarnojević.

To convert Radonjić in Radonić must be seen with intense Magyarization policy of Serbian population in the second half of the 19th century when the Serbian surname 'reduce' to 'ić' and 'vić' and end with the most on 'ov'. So Petrović becomes Petrov and Marković – Markov. So it's the same surname Radonjić and Radonić because neither conceptually nor etymologically do not have a name or term basis with "radon", which has a meaning in the Serbian language. Above said is true for the surname Radonić from Orlić in Dalmatia.

Notable people with the surname include:
 Novak Radonić (1826–1890), Austrian Serb painter
 Jovan Radonić (1873–1956), Serb historian and academic
 Ilarion Radonić (1871–1932), Serbian Orthodox bishop
 Miljko Radonić (1770–1836), Serb writer and professor
 Lovro Radonić, Croatian sportsman
 Ičica Barišić née Radonić, Croatian sportswoman
 Diana Radonić (1962-present), Serbian/German Entrepreneur 

Serbian surnames
Croatian surnames